Unión Lara Sport Club (Originally Unión Lara Fútbol Club) is a Venezuelan football team based in Barquisimeto, Lara State. Founded in 1999, it currently plays in Venezuelan Third Division, holding home games at the Farid Richa Stadium, with a capacity of 12,480 people.

History 

The Union Lara FC had its first game in the Copa República Bolivariana de Venezuela (2000) against Caracas Fútbol Club.

The club took part in the Second Venezuelan Division 2003/04 where it became the champion of the 'Apertura Tournament and played the final with Union Deportivo Marítimo, which would retain the title, when losing in regular time by penalties (4–1), which the global result finished in 2–2, remaining one more season in the category of silver of the Venezuelan football.

The 2004–2005 season of the Second Division of Venezuela began with the 'Apertura Tournament', where the team achieved 35 points in 20 games. For the 'Closing Tournament, it finished in 2nd place with 42 points, 5 less than the champion of the season Aragua Fútbol Club, remaining in the Second Division of Venezuela for one more season.

The Second Venezuelan Division 2005/06 started with the '2005 Apertura Tournament'. Unión Lara was part of the Central-Eastern Group in this tournament. The club placed 4th with 25 points, 6 victories, 7 draws, and a single defeat throughout the semester. This result allowed the club to advance to the 'Closing Tournament 2006'  where they fought for the promotion to the First Division of Venezuela. In the 'Closing Tournament 2006, "The Neighborhood Team" was close to the promotion, finishing the tournament in the third place with 37 points, one less than the promoted Portuguesa Fútbol Club and Zamora Fútbol Club.

Before the start of the Copa América 2007, the FVF decided to expand both the First Division of Venezuela and the Second Division of Venezuela. As a result of this, the Union Lara FC played in the top category for the 2007–2008 season. The First Venezuelan Division 2007/08 started with the 'Opening Apertura 2007', a tournament national scope, where Union Lara achieved 3 victories throughout the semester and ended with 14 points, placing second to last and surpassing Red Star FC. For the 'Closing Tournament 2008'''  similar result ocurred, where the club placed secon to last with 14 points and a total of 9 losses in the entire tournament. It placed last in the accumulated table of the season, and has been demoted to the Second Division of Venezuela for the following season.

The Second Venezuelan Division 2008/09 started with the 'Opening Apertura 2008'. The Union Lara FC finished 11th in this tournament, achieving a total of 18 points in 15 matches. For the 'Clausura 2009, the club achieved a total of 5 wins and add 17 points, placing 11th again. In the accumulated table of the season the club occupied the 10th place.

For the Second Venezuelan Division 2009/10 three Larense teams: Unión Lara FC, Lara FC Police and UCLA FC joined to form the revival of Lara Fútbol Club. The Lara Fútbol Club was a team with a long history as the first non-capital national champion in 1965. It was also the first Larense champion in the top category and for participated in the Copa Libertadores of 1966. The Lara Fútbol Club remained in the silver category and played in the Ascent Tournament in the Second Venezuelan Division 2011/12 before economic problems led to its dissolution. As the reborn Lara Fútbol Club played in the Segunda División Venezolana 2009/10 with the quota of Lara FC Police, the quota left by Unión Lara was occupied by the Club Deportivo San Antonio, the Larense image disappeared due to the aforementioned merger.

 Rebirth of the Union 

For the 2012–2013 Tournament and after many rumors, the Lara Union squad is reborn, now with the Sports Club name, which participates in the Third Division of Venezuela. The 2012–2013 season of the Third Division (Third Venezuelan Division 2012/13) began with the '2012 Apertura Tournament', where the Larense squad was in Central Group II, ending in 3rd with a total of 11 points, 3 wins, 2 draws and 3 losses, having to play for staying in the category in the following semester of the season. The next tournament of the season is the 'Clausura 2013 where the teams that did not manage to qualify for the '2013 Promotion and Permanence Tournament' and those teams and institutions that wish to enter the category, participate commonly called "aspirants". The team is part of the Central-Western Group, where they finish last in the group with only 6 points and only one victory in the entire semester.

For the Third Venezuelan Division 2013/14, it is part of the Central Group II of the 'Opening 2013', where it managed to add a total of 13 units, classifying the next tournament of the season as one of the best third places. The club took part in the Central Group of the 'Tournament of Promotion and Permanence 2014, a tight group that was decided on the last day, where the Larense team managed to finish in second place with 23 units and a total of 7 victories throughout the semester, thus achieving promotion to the Second Division of Venezuela for the following season.

 Name changes 

 Club information 

  'Seasons in 1st' : 1 (07-08)
  'Seasons in 2nd' : 5 (03-04, 04-05, 05-06, 06-07, 08-09)
  'Seasons in 3rd' : 3 (12–13, 13–14, 14–15, 15–16)

 Stadium 
The Farid Richa Stadium is a football stadium located in the capital city of Lara State, Barquisimeto, in the center of Venezuela, it is the headquarters of the local football team of the first division 'Unión Lara Sport Club' ''and two other teams (Unión Deportiva Lara and Lara Fútbol Club Police), was baptized with that name in homage to a prominent player of origin Lebanese Farid Richa, was reopened in 2001, and has a capacity of approximately 12,480 spectators.

References

Links 
 Unofficial website
 

Association football clubs established in 1999
Football clubs in Venezuela
Lara (state)
1999 establishments in Venezuela